Troska is a village in Poland.

Troska may also refer to:

17776 Troska, main-belt asteroid

People with the surname
Jan Matzal Troska, Czech writer

See also

Toska (disambiguation)
Trosky (disambiguation)